| tries = 
| top point scorer = 
| top try scorer = 
| Player of the tournament =
| website = 
| previous year = 2019
| previous tournament = 2019 Rugby Europe Championship
| next year = 2021
| next tournament = 2021 Rugby Europe Championship
}}

The 2020 Rugby Europe Championship is the fourth season of the Rugby Europe International Championships, the premier rugby union competition for European national teams outside the Six Nations Championship. The competing teams are Belgium, Georgia, Romania, Russia and Spain (the top five teams from 2019), and Portugal, who qualified after defeating Germany in the promotion/relegation play-off of the 2019 Championship.

Participants

Table

Fixtures

Week 1

Week 2

Week 3

Week 4

Week 5

Relegation/promotion play-off

International broadcasters

See also 
 Rugby Europe International Championships
 2019–20 Rugby Europe International Championships
 Antim Cup
 Six Nations Championship
 2020 Rugby Europe Championship squads

References

External links
 Rugby Europe official website

2019–20 Rugby Europe International Championships
Rugby Europe Championship
Rugby Europe
Rugby Europe
Rugby Europe
Rugby Europe
Rugby Europe
Rugby Europe
Rugby Europe
Rugby Europe
2019–20 in Belgian rugby union
2019–20 in German rugby union
2019–20 in Portuguese rugby union
2019–20 in Romanian rugby union
2019–20 in Spanish rugby union
2020 in Russian rugby union
2020 in Georgian sport